William Juxon (1582 – 4 June 1663) was an English churchman, Bishop of London from 1633 to 1646 and Archbishop of Canterbury from 1660 until his death.

Life

Education
Juxon was the son of Richard Juxon and was born probably in Chichester, and educated at the local grammar school, The Prebendal School. He then went on to Merchant Taylors' School, London, and St John's College, Oxford, where he was elected to a scholarship in 1598.

Ecclesiastical offices
Juxon studied law at Oxford, but afterwards took holy orders, and in 1609 became vicar of St Giles' Church, Oxford, where he stayed until he became rector of Somerton, Oxfordshire in 1615. In December 1621, he succeeded his friend, William Laud, as President (i.e. head) of St John's College, and in 1626 and 1627 he was Vice-Chancellor of the University of Oxford. Juxon soon obtained other important positions, including that in 1632 of Clerk of the Closet to King Charles I.

In 1627, he was made Dean of Worcester and in 1632 he was nominated to the See of Hereford and resigned the presidency of St John's in January 1633. Though he legally became Bishop of Hereford by the confirmation of his election in late July 1633, he never took up duties at Hereford, as in October 1633 he was consecrated Bishop of London in succession to Laud.

Secular offices
In March 1636 Charles I entrusted Juxon with important secular duties by making him Lord High Treasurer of England as well as First Lord of the Admiralty; for the next five years he had to deal with many financial and other difficulties. He resigned the treasurership in May 1641. During the Civil War, the bishop, against whom no charges were brought in parliament, lived undisturbed at Fulham Palace. His advice was often sought by the king, who had a very high opinion of him. The king selected Juxon to be with him on the scaffold and to offer him the last rites before his execution.

Retirement and archbishopric
Juxon was deprived of the See of London by Parliament on 9 October 1646, and episcopacy was abolished for the duration of the Commonwealth and the Protectorate. He retired to Little Compton in Gloucestershire (now in Warwickshire), where he had bought an estate, and became famous as the owner of a pack of hounds. At the restoration of Charles II, letters missive were issued (on 2 September 1660) naming Juxon (restored Bishop of London) Archbishop of Canterbury.

The congé d'élire was issued the next day and the chapter of Canterbury duly elected him on 13 September. The king's assent to the election was given on 15 September and the confirmation of Juxon's election (the legal ceremony by which he took office) was held in the Henry VII Chapel of Westminster Abbey on 20 September 1660. He received the temporalities on 22 September and was enthroned at Canterbury on 25 September. Juxon, as Archbishop of Canterbury, then took part in the new king's coronation, but his health soon began to fail and he died at Lambeth in 1663. By his will the archbishop was a benefactor to St John's College, where he was buried; he also aided the work of restoring St Paul's Cathedral and rebuilt the great hall at Lambeth Palace.

Memorials
Juxon House, which stands north-west of St Paul's Cathedral at the top of Ludgate Hill in London and forms part of the Paternoster Square development, is named after him. Juxon Street on land at Walton Manor formerly owned by St John's College in the inner-city suburb of Jericho, Oxford, is also named after him  as is another Juxon Street at Lambeth Walk, close to Juxon's former residence at Lambeth Palace.

Notes

References

External links

|-

1582 births
1663 deaths
People from Chichester
People educated at The Prebendal School
People educated at Merchant Taylors' School, Northwood
Alumni of St John's College, Oxford
Presidents of St John's College, Oxford
Vice-Chancellors of the University of Oxford
English chaplains
Chaplains-in-Ordinary
Deans of Worcester
Bishops of Hereford
Bishops of London
Archbishops of Canterbury
17th-century Anglican archbishops
Lord High Treasurers
Clerks of the Closet
17th-century Church of England bishops